"Mississippi" is a song by Dutch country pop band Pussycat. Written by Werner Theunissen and produced by Eddy Hilberts, "Mississippi" was the group's first number-one single in their home country, as well as their only number-one single in most countries worldwide. In New Zealand and South Africa, "Mississippi" was their first of two number-one singles; it was the best-selling single of 1977 in the latter nation.

History

Werner Theunissen wrote "Mississippi" in 1969 being inspired by the Bee Gees song "Massachusetts". The song grabbed EMI Bovema's attention, and they decided to sign the band. By December 1975, the song had topped the Dutch Singles Chart. Its international success came in 1976, when it reached number one in Belgium, Germany, Ireland, New Zealand, Norway, South Africa, Switzerland, and the United Kingdom, as well as number two in Australia, number four in Austria, and number six in Sweden. In South Africa, "Mississippi" was the highest-selling single of 1977. It is estimated to have sold five million copies worldwide. Outside the Netherlands, Pussycat would later achieve more number-one singles in New Zealand and South Africa, but in most territories, "Mississippi" was their highest-charting effort.

In the UK, the song was promoted by John Saunders Hughes through a Liverpool radio station. The lyrics are about the history of music, and how rock music became more popular than country music.

Charts

Weekly charts

Year-end charts

Sales and certifications

Covers
Swedish dansband Vikingarna covered the song in Swedish, with lyrics by Margot Borgström, in April 1976, less than six months after the original release. The Swedish song title was also "Mississippi", and it appeared on the band's album Kramgoa Låtar 3 the same year.

References

1975 songs
1975 singles
1976 singles
Dutch Top 40 number-one singles
EMI Records singles
Irish Singles Chart number-one singles
Number-one singles in Belgium
Number-one singles in Germany
Number-one singles in New Zealand
Number-one singles in Norway
Number-one singles in South Africa
Number-one singles in Switzerland
Private Stock Records singles
Sonet Records singles
Songs about Mississippi
Songs about rivers
Pussycat (band)
UK Singles Chart number-one singles
Jonathan King songs
Vikingarna (band) songs
Works about the Mississippi River

sl:Mississippi (skladba, Pussycat)